Timo Aleksander Laine (born 5 July 1934) is a former international speedway rider from Finland.

Speedway career 
Laine won the gold medal at the European Longtrack Championship in the 1961 Individual Long Track European Championship. In addition he won the Nordic Longtrack Championship three times (1964, 1965, 1966) and the Finish Longtrack Championship seven times (1962, 1963, 1964, 1965, 1967, 1968, 1972).

References 

1934 births
Finnish speedway riders
Living people